Until 1 January 2007 Hammel municipality was a municipality (Danish, kommune) in Aarhus County in central Denmark.  The municipality covered an area of 144 km2, and had a total population of 10.830 (2005).  Its last mayor was Ole Brøkner, a member of the Conservative People's Party (Det Konservative Folkeparti) political party. The main town and site of its municipal council was the town of Hammel.

 Hammel Parish
 Haurum Parish
 Lading Parish
 Røgen Parish
 Sall Parish
 Skjød Parish
 Søby Parish
 Sporup Parish
 Voldby Parish

Hammel municipality ceased to exist due to Kommunalreformen ("The Municipality Reform" of 2007).  It was merged with existing Hadsten, Hinnerup, and Hvorslev municipalities, as well as the southern part of Langå municipality to form the new Favrskov municipality.  This created a municipality with an area of 487 km2 and a total population of ca. 41,596 (2005).  The new municipality belongs to Region Midtjylland ("Mid-Jutland Region").

External links 
 Favrskov municipality's website

References  
 Municipal statistics: NetBorger Kommunefakta, delivered from KMD aka Kommunedata (Municipal Data)
 Municipal mergers and neighbors: Eniro new municipalities map

Former municipalities of Denmark